Chamnaom is a commune (khum) of Mongkol Borei District in Banteay Meanchey Province in northwestern Cambodia.

Villages

 Pralay Char
 Rongvean Lech
 Rongvean Kaeut
 Chamnaom Lech
 Chamnaom Kaeut
 Roung Kou Daeum
 Roung Kou Kandal
 Roung Kou Chong
 Peam Roung kou
 Ta Sal
 Chuor Khchas
 Boeng Tras
 Dang Trang
 Srae Prey
 Bos Tonloab
 Ta Bun
 Kouk Ponley
 Say Samon
 Damnak Preas Ang

References

Communes of Banteay Meanchey province
Mongkol Borey District